Mostowo may refer to the following places:
Mostowo, Mława County in Masovian Voivodeship (east-central Poland)
Mostowo, Ostrołęka County in Masovian Voivodeship (east-central Poland)
Mostowo, West Pomeranian Voivodeship (north-west Poland)